Dig This! is an album by American jazz flautist Bobbi Humphrey recorded in 1972 and released on the Blue Note label.

Reception
The AllMusic review awarded the album 4 stars.

Track listing
 "Lonely Town, Lonely Street" (Bill Withers) - 4:33    
 "Is This All?" (Henry Johnson) - 3:42   
 "Smiling Faces Sometimes" (Barrett Strong, Norman Whitfield) - 6:18  
 "Virtue" (Alphonse Mouzon) - 4:25   
 "I Love Every Little Thing About You" (Stevie Wonder) - 4:18   
 "Love Theme from "Fuzz"" (Dave Grusin) - 3:45   
 "El Mundo de Maravillas" (Mouzon) - 7:30   
 "Nubian Lady" (Kenny Barron) - 4:45
Recorded at A&R Studios in New York City on July 20 & 21, 1972.

Personnel
Bobbi Humphrey - flute
George Marge - oboe, English horn
Seymour Berman, Paul Gershman, Irving Spice, Paul Winter - violin
Julian Barber - viola
Seymour Barab - cello
Eugene Bianco - harp
Harry Whitaker - electric piano
Paul Griffin - electric piano, clavinet
William Fontaine, David Spinozza - guitar
Ron Carter - bass
Wilbur Bascomb, Jr. - electric bass
Alphonse Mouzon - drums, bell tree, arranger
Warren Smith - percussion
Wade Marcus, Horace Ott - arranger

References 

Blue Note Records albums
Bobbi Humphrey albums
1972 albums
Albums arranged by Wade Marcus
Albums arranged by Horace Ott
Albums produced by George Butler (record producer)